Burschenschaft Hannovera is the oldest Burschenschaft, a traditional liberal German Student fraternity or student corporation (Studentenverbindung), incorporated in Göttingen in the Revolution year 1848 (May) at the Georg August University of Göttingen. The founding group was a circle of graduates of the lyceum in Hanover who were studying at Göttingen. Hannovera was chosen as name because the founders where citizens of the Kingdom of Hanover. 
Hannovera is a lifelong bond (Lebensbund), which brings together students and alumni of Göttingen University. It is the only one of the classic German fraternities ever to include a woman: the Swedish Nightingale Jenny Lind.

History

After almost 100 years of successful growth, Hannovera was forced into dissolution in the Third Reich by order Br.-Nr. II C–1462/39 of the secret state police (Gestapo) Hildesheim, dated April 28, 1939. 
As a result of World War II, 26 members lost their lives at the front or in captivity. 
In February 1951, Hannovera was reconstituted as an active covenant by a group of young students and has been active until today.

Principles

In addition to the motto of all old Burschenschaft, Ehre, Freiheit, Vaterland (i.e. "Honor, Freedom, Fatherland"), Hannovera bears its own motto, Freiheit durch Einigkeit (i.e. "Freedom through unity") and therefore stands in the democratic tradition of the Urburschenschaft, follows common principles of German unity, democracy, convention principle, tolerance and livelong friendship (Lebensbund). It also preserves the principle of facultative academic fencing.

Couleur

 
Hannoveras couleurs are "green-white-red" with silver lining. All members wear the same ribbon. The cap is green with green-white-red. Following the color of the caps, the members of the fraternity are traditionally called Grüne Hannoveraner (i.e. "Green Hanoverians") or, in inner (fraternity) circles, simply Die Grünen (i.e."The Greens").

Own house

Since 1908, Hannovera has owned its club house (Grünenhaus) in Göttingen, Herzberger Landstraße 9, now a Listed Building of Special Architectural and Historic Interest, surrounded by a private garden. It also houses a small student dormitory. The house used to belong to the Protestant theologian Albrecht Ritschl.

Cartel

Some notable members

 August Dresbach (1894–1968) Journalist, Politician, Member of Parliament (Bundestag) 
 Victor von Ebner (1842–1925) Anatomist and Histologist 
 Berend Wilhelm Feddersen (1832–1918) Physicist 
 Wolfgang Helbig (1839–1915) Classical Archaeologist 
 Lorenz Franz Kielhorn (1840-1908) Indologist 
 Karl Johann Kiessling (1839–1905) Physicist, Mathematician, Botanist 
 Wilhelm Krause (1833–1910) Anatomist 
 Carl von Lemcke (1831–1913) Aesthetician, Art Historian, Novelist
 Jenny Lind (1820–1887) Opera Singer
 Karl von Lützow (1832–1897) Art Historian, Critic 
 Alexander Mitscherlich (1836–1918) Chemist 
 Hans Mühlenfeld (1901–1969) Politician, Diplomat, Ambassador 
 Henry Bradford Nason (1831–1895) Chemist
 Franz Overbeck (1837–1905) Protestant Theologian 
 Friedrich Stohmann (1832–1897) Agricultural Chemist 
 Max Weber Sr. (1836–1897) Lawyer, Politician, Member of the Reichstag of the German Empire
 Hermann Wichelhaus (1842–1927) Chemist 
 Richard Witting (1856–1923) Politician, Member of the Prussian House of Lords, Banker

Further reading

 Carl Römpler: Versuch einer Geschichte (history) der Burschenschaft Hannovera Göttingen, Dieterich’sche Verlagsbuchhandlung, Göttingen 1897. 
 Theo Lampmann: Geschichte (history) der Burschenschaft Hannovera-Göttingen seit Anfang der neunziger Jahre bis 1928, Druck von C.V. Engelhard, Hannover 1928.
 Henning Tegtmeyer: Geschichte (history) der Burschenschaft Hannovera 1928–1945. WJK-Verlag, Hilden 2009, .
 Henning Tegtmeyer: Mitgliederverzeichnis (List of members) der Burschenschaft Hannovera Göttingen 1848–1998. Self-published, Düsseldorf 1998.

Links
Burschenschaft Hannovera Göttingen (German)
Hannovera facebook

Notes

Student societies in Germany
1848 establishments in Germany
University of Göttingen alumni
Göttingen